Oryol State Agrarian University named after N. V. Parakhin or Oryol SAU named after N. V. Parakhin (Oryol SAU; , Orlovskiy gosudarstvennyy agrarnyy universitet imeni N. V. Parakhina; Orlovskiy GAU im. N. V. Parakhina) is a state agrarian and natural sciences university located in the city of Oryol, the administrative centre of Oryol Oblast.

History 
Oryol Agricultural Institute was founded in Oryol in 1975. In 1995, a decision was made to transform the institute into the Oryol State Agricultural Academy. Officially, the transformation took place on 10 February 1996. In 1999, the academy was transformed into the Oryol State Agrarian University.

In 2015, Oryol SAU became a member of the Eurasian Association of Universities.

For many years (1982-1986, 1994–2008, 2010–2016) Academician of the Russian Academy of Sciences, Nikolai Vasilyevich Parakhin, was the rector of the university. After his death, on 15 June 2016, the Oryol State Agrarian University received the name of N. V. Parakhin.

On 30 March 2017, Rosobrnadzor banned the admission of students to the Oryol SAU. In April of the same year, after the elimination of violations, this ban was removed.

At the end of 2020, the Oryol State Agrarian University took 9th place among 54 Russian agricultural universities in the “National Recognition” ranking.

Educational and operational activities 
The institute includes 7 faculties (Faculty of Economics; Institute for Rural Development and Additional Education; Faculty of Agrotechnics and Energy Supply; Faculty of Biotechnology and Veterinary Medicine; Institute of Civil Engineering; Multidisciplinary College; Faculty of Agribusiness and Ecology), 25 divisions (chairs), as well as 30 other structural divisions.

Gallery

References

External links 
 Official site

Oryol
Educational institutions established in 1975
1975 establishments in the Soviet Union
Agricultural universities and colleges in Russia